The president of Uruguay, officially known as the president of the Oriental Republic of Uruguay, is the head of state and head of government of Uruguay. Their rights are determined in the Constitution of Uruguay. Along with the Secretariat of the Presidency, the Council of Ministers and the director of the Office of Planning and Budget, the President is part of the executive branch. In case of absence, their office is exercised by the vice president. In turn, the president of the republic is the commander in chief of the Armed Forces.

Since 1990, the president's term has begun and ended on 1 March. This same date for ending the presidency also happened during the National Council of Government (1952–1967) and it has been not unusual since 1839.
The current president since 1 March 2020 is Luis Lacalle Pou, who is the 42nd president of Uruguay—and also the child of the 36th president, Luis Alberto Lacalle.

Features of the office

Requirements 
The Constitution amendment establishes the requirements for becoming president. Article 151 establishes that the president must be a natural-born citizen of the country, or have been born to an Uruguayan citizen if born abroad. The president must also be at least 35 years old and be registered in the National Civic Registry.

Election 
According to the current Constitution Constitution of Uruguay of 1967 or Constitution of Uruguay of 1997, the president is elected by direct popular vote for a term of five years. A person may be reelected to the presidency any number of times, but is ineligible for immediate reelection. The president and vice president run on a single ticket submitted by their party. In case no candidate obtains an absolute majority of votes (50%+1), a runoff is held between the top two candidates. In this case, the candidate who obtains a plurality in the runoff wins the election.

Powers and duties 
According to Article 168 of the Constitution, the president, acting with the respective minister or ministers, or the Council of Ministers, includes, is assigned:

The preservation of order and tranquility within and security without.
The command of all armed forces.
The promulgation of all laws, issuing special regulations necessary for its implementation.
The delivery, to the General Assembly of Uruguay at the opening of regular sessions, the state of the Republic address.
The right to veto laws he dislikes.
The right to propose bills or amendments to laws previously enacted.
The dismissal of public employees for misfeasance, malfeasance or nonfeasance.
Management of diplomatic relations and, with consent of the legislature, the right to declare war.
The right to declare a state of emergency when needed.
The preparation of the state budget.
Negotiation of treaties with the ratification of the legislature.

Succession 

Article 153 of the Constitution establishes that in the event of absence, resignation, cessation, or death of the President and Vice President, the Presidency of the Republic shall be assumed by the first titular Senator of the list most voted for of the political party by which they were elected.

Residence 
The Suárez Residence in Montevideo is the official residence of the president. The site was acquired by Adelina Lerena de Fein at auction, and the construction of a three-storey house by the young architect Juan María Aubriot, was ordered by Fein Lerena family. In 1925, the young Luis Batlle Berres and Matilde Ibáñez Tálice met while walking in front of this property. Soon after they were married. In 1947, Luis Batlle Berres was already head of state, and at the suggestion of his spouse they chose this mansion as their official residence.

The Anchorena Presidential Estate is the president's country residence. Located in the Colonia Department, 208 kilometers from Montevideo, is the result of the legacy of the aristocrat Aarón de Anchorena who gave about 1,369 hectares of his estate to the Uruguayan State. The mansion combines the Norman and Tudor styles.

The president also has the use of a mansion in Punta del Este, which is called "Woodland’s," and serves as a vacation residence. It was donated to the Uruguayan State by the Argentine businessman Mauricio Litman.

See also 
History of Uruguay
Politics of Uruguay

References

External links 
Politics Data Bank at the Social Sciences School – Universidad de la República (Uruguay)

 
1830 establishments in Uruguay